Pawan Kumar (born 29 October 1982) is an Indian film director, actor, producer, and screenwriter from the Kannada film industry.

Pawan Kumar is well known for writing the films Manasaare and Pancharangi. His directorial debut Lifeu Ishtene (2011) and the 2013 psychological thriller Lucia became one of the biggest turning points of his career. Being from a theatre background, he wrote scripts for plays on stage before working as an associate director with Yograj Bhat. He has also acted in the plays he wrote namely "The Final Reharsal" (2002) which is about an actor and reality television and "The woman in me" which is loosely based on the concept that there is a woman in every man and vice versa.
Pawan also holds a production house named Pawan Kumar Films. Recently during lockdown, Pawan gave free online workshop on YouTube. He also shot a short film at home- A Labour unthanked.

Filmography

As director

Feature films

Web series

As actor

Accolades

References

External links
 
 
 
 
 

Film directors from Bangalore
Kannada film directors
Living people
1982 births
Male actors in Kannada cinema
Indian male film actors
Filmfare Awards South winners
21st-century Indian film directors
21st-century Indian male actors
Male actors from Bangalore
Kannada film producers
Film producers from Bangalore

Telugu film directors